United States Virgin Islands women's junior national softball team is the junior national team for United States Virgin Islands.  The team competed at the 1995 ISF Junior Women's World Championship in Normal, Illinois where they finished fourteenth.

References

External links 
 International Softball Federation

Softball
United States Virgin Islands
Softball in the United States Virgin Islands
Women's sports in the United States Virgin Islands
Youth sport in the United States Virgin Islands